Waleed Yaqub (born 5 February 1974) is a Pakistani cricket umpire. He has stood in domestic matches in the 2017–18 Quaid-e-Azam Trophy and the Departmental and Regional one-day cups.

References

External links
 

1974 births
Living people
Pakistani cricket umpires
Place of birth missing (living people)